Tytthoscincus panchorensis, the Bukit Panchor forest skink, is a species of skink. It is endemic to Malaysia.

References

panchorensis
Endemic fauna of Malaysia
Reptiles of Malaysia
Reptiles described in 2016
Taxa named by Larry Lee Grismer